William Brady (March 26, 1880  February 25, 1972) was an American physician and pioneering medical columnist.

Biography

Brady was born in Canandaigua, New York. He obtained his M.D. from the University of Buffalo in 1901. He began his medical practice in Buffalo, New York, in 1901. In 1904, he married Cora May McGuire, they had two daughters.

In 1914, Brady started the first syndicated medical column "Personal Health Service" in the Elmira Star-Gazette, which he wrote until his death in 1972. Brady was "America's oldest columnist, in age and in number of years of syndication." He wrote the medical column for 58 years. It was syndicated in daily newspapers throughout the United States.

Brady also edited the medical column "Here's to Health" in the Los Angeles Times. In this column, Brady supported the consumption of saccharin. He recommended it as a substitute for "stout people who are trying to reduce and those who wish to avoid accumulating more slacker flesh". In 1946, he commented that there was "ample scientific evidence" to suggest that anyone could consume up to five grains of saccharine a day. He wrote articles recommending people to take iodine doses. Brady was also supportive of the meat diet of Vilhjalmur Stefansson. In his 1961 book, Brady admitted he held "strange notions" that were based on a "lifetime of sometimes unorthodox observation and practice are geared to keeping patients out of doctors' offices." He died of uremia at his home in Beverly Hills, California.

Reception

Brady was criticized by other physicians for making misrepresentations about medical treatments and promoting dubious health advice. A 1937 article in the Journal of the American Medical Association commented that Brady "has during recent years gradually departed from anything resembling accuracy or established medical science."

A 1946 article in the Journal of the American Dental Association noted that:

The Southern California State Dental Association accused Brady of misinforming his readers on specific dental ailments.

Selected publications

An 80 Year Old Doctor's Secrets of Positive Health (1961)

References

1880 births
1972 deaths
20th-century American newspaper editors
20th-century American physicians
American columnists
American health and wellness writers
Pseudoscientific diet advocates
University at Buffalo alumni